The 1940 Australian Championships was a tennis tournament that took place on outdoor Grass courts at the White City Tennis Club, Sydney, Australia from 19 January to 29 January. It was the 33rd edition of the Australian Championships (now known as the Australian Open), the 9th held in Sydney, and the first Grand Slam tournament of the year. The singles titles were won by Australians Adrian Quist and Nancye Wynne.

Finals

Men's singles

 Adrian Quist defeated  Jack Crawford  6–3, 6–1, 6–2

Women's singles

 Nancye Wynne defeated  Thelma Coyne  5–7, 6–4, 6–0

Men's doubles

 John Bromwich /  Adrian Quist defeated  Jack Crawford /  Vivian McGrath 6–3, 7–5, 6–1

Women's doubles

 Thelma Coyne /  Nancye Wynne defeated  Joan Hartigan /  Edie Niemeyer 7–5, 6–2

Mixed doubles

 Nancye Wynne /  Colin Long defeated  Nell Hall Hopman /  Harry Hopman 7–5, 2–6, 6–4

External links
 Australian Open official website

Australian Championships
Australian Championships (tennis) by year
 
January 1940 sports events